PB-15 Sohbatpur is a constituency of the Provincial Assembly of Balochistan.

General elections 2013

General elections 2008

See also
 PB-14 Nasirabad-II
 PB-16 Jafarabad

References

External links
 Election commission Pakistan's official website
 Awazoday.com check result
 Balochistan's Assembly official site

Constituencies of Balochistan